MIB may refer to:

Computing
Mebibyte (MiB), a multiple of the unit byte for digital information
Management information base, a computing information repository used by the Simple Network Management Protocol
Modular infotainment platform vehicle infotainment architecture
Man-in-the-browser attack

Fiction
 Men in Black (1934 film), a Three Stooges short
 Men in Black (franchise)
 The Men in Black (comics)
 Men in Black (1997 film), based on the comic
 Men in Black II, its 2002 sequel
 Men in Black 3, its 2012 trilogy closer
 Men in Black: International, its 2019 spin-off
 Men in Black: The Series, based on the original film
 The Man in Black (Lost), the main antagonist in the TV series Lost
 The Man in Black (Westworld), the main antagonist in the TV series Westworld
 The Medical Inspection Bureau, a fictional organization from the manga series Battle Angel Alita

Places
 Minot Air Force Base, IATA code MIB

People
 Michael Ian Black (born 1971), American comedian, actor and writer

Organizations
 Men in Black (disambiguation), in conspiracy theory, a group of mysterious agents
 Manchester Institute of Biotechnology
 Meiringen-Innertkirchen-Bahn, a Swiss railway company
 MIB Group (formerly Medical Information Bureau), an insurance industry fraud prevention data exchange
 MIB School of Management Trieste, an international business school in Trieste, Italy
 Motor Insurers' Bureau, a British company which deals with uninsured compensation claims
 M.I.B (band), a South Korean music group
 Mishap Investigation Board (MIB), an ad hoc NASA board to investigate incidents and mishaps, e.g. the Genesis MIB

Business
 MCB Islamic Bank, Pakistani bank
 FTSE MIB (Milano Italia Borsa), the main stock market index of the Borsa Italiana
 Master of International Business, a postgraduate master's degree
 Master of Internet Business, a postgraduate master's degree (e.g. ISDI University)

Science
 Mibolerone, a potent synthetic anabolic-androgenic steroid
 Motion induced blindness, a visual illusion
 2-methylisoborneol, a musty-smelling odorant sometimes found in drinking water and cork taint
 2-methylisoborneol synthase, an enzyme

Other
 Melayu Islam Beraja, the adopted national philosophy of Brunei
 monkey intelligence bureau, which is an upgrade for the tower village in bloons tower defense which is a tower defense game made by ninja kiwi 
 Message in a bottle, a form of communication in which a message is sealed in a container and released
 Mint In Box, a collector's abbreviation for an item in mint condition

See also

 
 
 
 
 Man in Black (disambiguation)
 Men in Black (disambiguation)
 MIB1